Priddy is a village in Somerset, England in the Mendip Hills, close to East Harptree and  north-west of Wells. It is in the local government district of Mendip.

There are remains of lead mining activities and caves in the limestone beneath the village.

It is the venue for the annual Priddy Folk Festival. The Sheep Fair, was last held in 2013.

Etymology 
Priddy, with medieval variations of spellings such as Predy, Priddie, Pridi, Pridia, Pridie and Prydde, is a name that has been ascribed to the Welsh influence that pre-dated the arrival of the Saxon English. It has been particularly attributed to pridd (= "earth"). This might be suggestive of the Iron Age mining activities. The Latin words pratum (= a meadow) and praedium (= a farm) have given rise to such Alpine names as Preda and Prada and it has been suggested that they are also the root for the cymric words prydd, pryddion meaning "production", as with a fertile meadow. "Priddy" could just mean "meadow land".

An alternative explanation is 'The high water' from the Celtic prid and the Old English ea, and another alternative suggests it could come from the Welsh word preiddiau, pronounced preidhye, meaning flock or herd.

History 

In 1977 a Mesolithic hut site was excavated at Priddy. Nearby are the Priddy Circles a stone circle or henge monument, which appears to be contemporary with Stonehenge, i.e. Neolithic circa 2180 BC. The North Hill location of two round barrow cemeteries, Ashen Hill and Priddy Nine-Barrows which are neighbours of the Circles, would seem to imply that the area to the north-east of Priddy held ritual significance into the Bronze Age. South of the village at Deer Leap is a Bronze Age burial mound and the remains of a medieval settlement of Ramspit. Drove Cottage Henge is a Neolithic ceremonial location to the east of the village.

Lead was being worked as far back as 300 to 200 BC. The area east and north-west of the village shows extensive patches of "gruffy ground". The word "gruffy" derives from the grooves that were formed where the lead ore was extracted from veins near the surface. The relatively easy opencast extraction of lead was a strong attraction for the Romans. Lead ingots found in the neighbourhood have been dated to AD 49. The ruins of St Cuthbert's Leadworks which closed in 1908 can still be seen. According to tradition Joseph of Arimathea and the young Jesus stayed at Priddy when they came to Somerset. It has been proposed that Joseph was a trader of Cornish tin and of the lead and copper of Somerset.

Although the village is not mentioned in the Domesday Book it appears to be the subject of a lost Saxon charter of the late 7th or 8th century. The parish was part of the hundred of Wells Forum.

Since the 1920s, the kennels for the Mendip Farmers' Hunt fox hounds have been based near the village, but the hunt was planning to relocate them to Chewton Mendip, a move which has faced significant local opposition.
The group starts a number of fox hunts from the village green, including one on Boxing Day. In 2014 a decision was made by Mendip District Council to allow the development of the kennels in the village.

In April 2013 the stack of sheep hurdles on the green was set alight in an arson attack. In July 2013, locals remade The Hurdles.

An annual Sheep Fair began in the village in 1348, moving from Wells as a result of the Black Death. It was last held in 2013. The parish council and sheep fair committee cancelled the 2014 event, describing it as unsustainable. The parish council dissolved the organising Sheep Fair Committee in July 2016.

Governance 

The parish council has responsibility for local issues, including setting an annual precept (local rate) to cover the council's operating costs and producing annual accounts for public scrutiny. The parish council evaluates local planning applications and works with the local police, district council officers, and neighbourhood watch groups on matters of crime, security, and traffic. The parish council's role also includes initiating projects for the maintenance and repair of parish facilities, as well as consulting with the district council on the maintenance, repair, and improvement of highways, drainage, footpaths, public transport, and street cleaning. Conservation matters (including trees and listed buildings) and environmental issues are also the responsibility of the council.

The village falls within the Non-metropolitan district of Mendip, which was formed on 1 April 1974 under the Local Government Act 1972, having previously been part of Wells Rural District, which is responsible for local planning and building control, local roads, council housing, environmental health, markets and fairs, refuse collection and recycling, cemeteries and crematoria, leisure services, parks, and tourism.

Somerset County Council is responsible for running the largest and most expensive local services such as education, social services, libraries, main roads, public transport, policing and fire services, trading standards, waste disposal and strategic planning.

It is also part of the Wells county constituency represented in the House of Commons of the Parliament of the United Kingdom. It elects one Member of Parliament (MP) by the first past the post system of election.

Geography 
Priddy Pools, a Site of Special Scientific Interest (SSSI), were originally formed when the Romans started mining lead in the area. Priddy Caves are also an SSSI with the entrance to Swildon's Hole just outside the village. Priddy Mineries is a Nature Reserve as is Chancellor's Farm. The other caves of the Mendip Hills in and around Priddy include: Eastwater Cavern, Hunter's Hole, St Cuthbert's Swallet, and Wigmore Swallet.

Religion 

The Church of St Lawrence dates from the 13th century, with some rebuilding in the 15th century and was restored in 1881–1888; it is a Grade I listed building. The three bells in the church were augmented to five in 1997. The church includes a medieval altar frontal.

On 29 October 2017 Metropolitan Seraphim (of the British Orthodox Church) consecrated Father David Seeds as Bishop David of Priddy.

References

External links 

 Map of Priddy circa 1900
 Rowberrow Barrows (Nr Priddy) report from CHERT CBA South West (2007) Retrieved on 4 December 2008.

Villages in Mendip District
Civil parishes in Somerset
Mendip Hills